Tangzhai Village of Tangzhai Town is a town and village in Dangshan County, Anhui Province, China, which is known for its apple and pear orchards, and for online marketing of its fruit.

References 

Dangshan County
Villages in China